Peter G. Angelos (born July 4, 1929) is an American trial lawyer and baseball executive from Baltimore, Maryland. Angelos is the majority owner of the Baltimore Orioles, a team in the American League of Major League Baseball.

Early life and education 
Angelos is the son of John (a bar owner) and Frances Angelos, who immigrated to the United States from Menetes, Karpathos, Greece. Peter Angelos married Georgia Kousouris in 1966, and they had two children together, John and Louis. Angelos' family settled in the working-class neighborhood of Highlandtown, and lived in a row house. Angelos' father owned a local tavern, and his father mostly spoke Greek at home.

After graduating from Patterson Park High School, Angelos attended the University of Baltimore, where he earned a bachelor's degree. He then attended law school at night at the University of Baltimore School of Law, and was named class valedictorian.

Career

Law practice
Angelos passed the bar in 1961 and opened an office specializing in handling product-liability cases for employees, almost always on a contingency basis. In one of his cases, he represented some 8,700 steelworkers, shipyard workers, and manufacturers' employees in a consolidated-action asbestos poisoning suit that was partially settled in 1992. Angelos' take from that litigation alone has been estimated at $330 million. He served a brief stint on the Baltimore City Council and ran for mayor on the city's first interracial ticket in 1967, and lost.

In March 1996 Maryland hired Angelos to represent the state in its suit against tobacco companies with a 25% contingency fee. After Angelos filed suit on behalf of the state the trial court ruled that the state's recovery would be limited to subrogation of losses through programs such as Medicaid; this would have effectively ended the state's case. Angelos successfully lobbied the state legislature to change the law to allow the state's suit to proceed. The state legislature also cut Angelos' fee to 12.5%. Eventually he settled for $150 million paid over five years.

Angelos also represented the state of Maryland in a suit against Philip Morris and suing Wyeth, the makers of part of the diet pill combination fen-phen. As of 2019, Angelos’ law firm had offices in Baltimore, Towson, and Cumberland, Maryland; Philadelphia, Bethlehem, and Harrisburg, Pennsylvania; and Knoxville, Tennessee. The firm is headquartered in the historic One Charles Center building in downtown Baltimore which was purchased by Angelos for $6 million in 1996.

Politics
A lifelong Democrat, Angelos began his political career with an unsuccessful run for State Senate in 1958. He went on to hold a seat on the Baltimore City Council from 1959 to 1963. He was the first Greek-American to be elected to the council. Though Angelos became known for demanding governmental oversight and fiscal responsibility, few of his calls for investigations into city agencies and spending led to lasting change. In 1963 he ran unsuccessfully for City Council President, losing to Thomas D'Alesandro III, scion and namesake of a popular former Mayor of Baltimore. He lost the primary for the 1967 Baltimore Mayor's race (on the city's first racially integrated ticket, as Clarence Mitchell III was running for City Council President)—again to D'Alesandro, who received nearly 75% of the vote and went on to beat Republican Arthur W. Sherwood in the general election. Three times in the 1960s he unsuccessfully challenged Republican incumbents in the Maryland Legislature. He has also used his influence with the small business community to call for the continuation of Maryland's Contributory negligence laws while most of the United States has adopted the more equitable distributary negligence system.

Angelos donated $272,000 to the independent expenditure-only committee (Super PAC) Draft Biden which sought to induce Vice President Joe Biden to enter the 2016 Democratic Primary for President.

Horse racing
Angelos breeds and races Thoroughbred horses and in 1998 purchased the  Ross Valley Farm in Baltimore County.

Baltimore Orioles

In 1993 Angelos assembled a group of investors to purchase the Orioles from New York venture capitalist Eli Jacobs. While Angelos was the principal investor, contributing $40 million, his fellow Oriole group owners included novelist Tom Clancy, filmmaker Barry Levinson, and tennis player Pam Shriver. On October 4, 1993, Jacobs sold the Orioles to Angelos' group for $173 million, the highest price paid for a sports franchise at that time. Angelos took over as managing partner and principal owner of the team. His official titles with the club are Chairman of the Board and Chief Executive Officer.

Angelos immediately became a hands-on owner and was willing to pay high salaries to talented free agents. Under Angelos' direction, the Orioles signed four high-priced free agents in 1994: Rafael Palmeiro, Sid Fernandez, Chris Sabo, and Lee Smith. As one of the newest members of the elite group of baseball owners, Angelos was expected to abide by the owners' decisions quietly without offering any alternatives or using his experience with labor law to negotiate with the players' union. Angelos did not like that arrangement and he did not particularly care if the world found out.

When the other owners signed a document cancelling the rest of the 1994 baseball season, including the World Series, Angelos refused to sign it because it blamed the players for the impasse. When the owners formed a committee to negotiate the strike, they did not include Angelos, despite his experience as a labor-management negotiator. When talks between the players and the owners stalled in December 1994, and the owners voted to impose a salary cap, Angelos was one of three dissenters to the arrangement. What brought him into the public eye, however, was his refusal to field replacement players should the strike last into the 1995 Major League Baseball season.

Angelos announced his decision about replacement players early in 1995 and was hailed in blue-collar Baltimore as a champion of the worker. As his fellow owners mulled what action to take against Angelos—everything from a $250,000 fine for each game missed to forcing the sale of the Orioles—the strike was finally settled in time for regular season play with major leaguers.

Angelos arranged for a two-game exhibition series to be played between the Orioles and the Cuban national baseball team in 1999. The Orioles won the first game, played in Havana, while the Cuban team won the second game, held at Oriole Park at Camden Yards. In 2000, the team's general manager, Syd Thrift, told The Washington Times that the team had a practice of not signing players who had defected from Cuba, which he attributed to Angelos' desire to avoid doing "anything that could be interpreted as being disrespectful" by the Cuban government. Angelos denied the existence of such a policy. Subsequent investigations by Major League Baseball and the United States Department of Justice did not find evidence that the absence of Cuban players on the Orioles' roster or in its minor league system was due to discrimination.

Since he became owner of the Orioles, Angelos has been a controversial figure. In the early years of his ownership, Angelos was repeatedly criticized by The Baltimore Sun for the team's performance, but has been praised by his associates for his work ethic and dedication. His stance during the 1994 baseball strike was extremely popular with fans. Critics accused Angelos rapidly hiring and firing baseball managers, and reportedly overruling their decisions. However, Angelos' decision to hire Andy MacPhail as the team's General Manager and President of Baseball Operations in 2007 was met with general approval.

In May 2009, a Sports Illustrated article reviewing owners of Major League Baseball franchises rated Angelos as the worst owner in the Major Leagues. The article notes that the methodology "was not scientific" and "weighing heavily in the decision was the team's success or failure on the field."  Two weeks later, Brady Anderson, a member of the Baltimore Orioles Hall of Fame, responded in an op-ed to The Baltimore Sun, writing that Angelos deserves to be on a list of the "best owners in baseball."

On April 16, 2010, a Fox Sports article suggested that Angelos allegedly denied a job to Cal Ripken Jr. when Ripken offered to come work for the franchise in a supporting role to help the O's young talent develop.  A day later, ESPN, MLB.com and The Baltimore Sun wrote that the Fox Sports story was inaccurate. Angelos denied that the two had spoken about potential opportunities with the Baltimore Orioles, but said he welcomed future discussions on the topic. On April 19, 2010, Cal Ripken Jr. issued a statement denying the Fox Sports story.  In the statement, Ripken expressed an interest in returning to baseball and described his relationship with Angelos as "very good."

Angelos' health began to fail in recent years, and his sons Louis and John began to take on more leadership roles in the Orioles as he focused more on his health. In February 2019, Major League Baseball informed the Orioles that they had until June to inform the League on who was currently controlling the team. This would require the team to name a new control person to represent them, although it would have no bearing on who would succeed Angelos as principal owner.

In October 2019 John P. Angelos, vice president of the Orioles, stated that neither he nor his father Peter had any plans to relocate the Orioles outside of Baltimore, contrary to rumors.

Charity
Angelos is known for various acts of charity and philanthropy, having contributed millions to civic and community institutions around Maryland. He has donated millions of dollars to the Democratic Party and its candidates, and is a major supporter of the Greek Orthodox Cathedral of the Annunciation (Baltimore, Maryland). He is the largest individual donor to the University of Baltimore and pledged $5 million to the school in 2008. In 2010, The Baltimore Sun reported that Angelos had recently donated $10 million to the university.  The same report notes that during the particularly hot summer of 2010, Angelos anonymously donated $300,000 to keep Baltimore city pools open.

Awards
He was named "Marylander of the Year" by The Baltimore Sun in 1998, with a citation that read: "Measured by professional accomplishments and contributions to his city and region, he is the Marylander of this decade." In 1995, Angelos received the Golden Plate Award of the American Academy of Achievement presented by Awards Council member Tom Clancy and was Host of the 1997 Achievement Summit in Baltimore. Angelos was awarded the Ellis Island Medal of Honor in 1996. In 2016, Angelos was inducted into Baltimore Sun's Business and Civic Hall of Fame for his lifetime of philanthropy.

References

External links
 Law Offices of Peter G. Angelos - official website.
 Waldman, Ed. "Sold! Angelos scored with '93 home run," The Baltimore Sun, August 1, 2004.

1929 births
Living people
American people of Greek descent
Baltimore City Council members
Baltimore Orioles owners
Major League Baseball executives
Maryland lawyers
American racehorse owners and breeders
University of Baltimore alumni
University of Baltimore School of Law alumni
Businesspeople from Baltimore
Lawyers from Baltimore